The Buckinghamshire Archaeological Society is an archaeological and historical society for the English county of Buckinghamshire. It was founded in 1847. It publishes an annual journal, Records of Buckinghamshire.

The society's records department was separated in 1947 when it became the Buckinghamshire Record Society.

Selected publications
 Archaeological investigations at Missenden Abbey (2018)
 My Dearest Ben: The personal letters of Benjamin Disraeli, by Thea van Dam
 Toll Roads of Buckinghamshire, by Peter Gulland
 Quarrendon: Aylesbury’s lost medieval village, by Michael Farley
 The Chilterns in 1748: An account by Pehr Kalm, visitor from Finland, edited and translated by professor William Mead

See also
 Centre for Buckinghamshire Studies

References

External links 
Official website

1847 establishments in England
History of Buckinghamshire
Organisations based in Buckinghamshire